Gunther Metz (born 8 August 1967, in Alzey) is a German football coach and a former player who is currently managing the under-19 team of 1. FC Kaiserslautern.

Honours
 DFB-Pokal finalist: 1995–96

References

1967 births
Living people
Association football defenders
German footballers
Germany youth international footballers
Germany under-21 international footballers
German football managers
1. FC Kaiserslautern II players
1. FC Kaiserslautern players
Karlsruher SC players
Bundesliga players
2. Bundesliga players
People from Alzey
Footballers from Rhineland-Palatinate
West German footballers